The Violin Concerto No. 5 in A major, K. 219, often referred to by the nickname "Turkish", was written by Wolfgang Amadeus Mozart in 1775, premiering during the Christmas season that year in Salzburg. It follows the typical fast-slow-fast musical structure.

Background 
Mozart composed the majority of his concertos for string instruments from 1773 to 1779, but it is unknown for whom, or for what occasion, he wrote them. Similarly, the dating of these works is unclear. Analysis of the handwriting, papers and watermarks has proved that all five violin concertos were re-dated several times. The year of composition of the fifth concerto "1775" was scratched out and replaced by "1780", and later changed again to "1775". Mozart would not use the key of A major for a concerto again until the Piano Concerto No. 12, K. 414.

The autograph score is preserved in the Library of Congress, Washington, D.C.

Structure 

The concerto is scored for two oboes, two horns and strings.

The movements are as follows:

The aperto marking on the first movement is rare in Mozart's instrumental music (two of his piano concerti, Piano Concerto No. 6 in B Major and Piano Concerto No. 8 in C Major, have this marking, as does his Oboe Concerto in C Major), but appears much more frequently in his operas. It implies that the piece should be played in a broader, more majestic way than might be indicated simply by allegro. The first movement opens with the orchestra playing the main theme, a typical Mozartian tune. The solo violin comes in with a short but sweet dolce adagio passage in A major with a simple accompaniment by the orchestra. (This is the only instance in Mozart's concerto repertoire in which an adagio interlude of this sort occurs at the first soloist entry of the concerto.) It then transitions back to the main theme with the solo violin playing a different melody on top of the orchestra. The first movement is 10–11 minutes long.

The rondo Finale is based on a minuet theme which recurs several times. This is characterised by the shift to A minor (from the original A major), and by the use of grotesque elements, such as unison chromatic crescendos, repetition of very short musical elements and col legno playing in the cellos and double basses. This section gave the concerto the nickname "The Turkish Concerto". The famous Rondo alla Turca from Mozart's piano sonata in A major features the same key and similar elements.

Mozart later composed the Adagio in E major for Violin and Orchestra, K. 261, as a substitute slow movement for this concerto.

A typical performance lasts about 28 minutes long.

References

External links
 
 

5
1775 compositions
Compositions in A major